Rosemary Casals and Ilana Kloss were the defending champions, but Kloss did not compete this year. Casals teamed up with Wendy Turnbull and lost in semifinals to Kathy Jordan and Paula Smith.

Kathy Jordan and Paula Smith won the title by defeating JoAnne Russell and Virginia Ruzici 6–3, 5–7, 7–6 in the final.

Seeds
The first four seeds received a bye into the second round.

Draw

Finals

Top half

Bottom half

References
 Official results archive (ITF)
 Official results archive (WTA)

Murjani WTA Championships - Doubles
Doubles